Liu Zhuang may refer to:

Emperor Ming of Han (28–75), Chinese emperor of the Han Dynasty
Liu Zhuang (musician) (1932–2011), Chinese musician